Payal is a city in Ludhiana district in the Punjab, India.

Demographics
 India census, Payal had a population of 8150. Males constitute 53% of the population and females 47%. Payal has an average literacy rate of 65%, higher than the national average of 59.5%: male literacy is 68%, and female literacy is 63%. In Payal, 13% of the population is under 6 years of age.

Payal is pronounced (pie 'al) and is a popular Indian name that means anklets in Hindi. It is an ancient city, very old temples more than 64, built in time or Mugal times, and also find ancient art pictures in temples (Mahadev Mandir, Ganga Sagar, Nainda Devi, Ram Mandir and others) It also has about six Gurudwaras (The main one was built on Old Mosques after Partition of India) and few mosques. And also there is an old fort, which has a girls school inside. Its original images and shapes have been destroyed, and a few political people are making shops under it.

Gallery

References

Cities and towns in Ludhiana district